Nicholas or Nick Baker may refer to:

Nick Baker (business executive), Australian business executive
Nicholas Baker (cyclist) (born 1957), Caymanian cyclist
Nicholas Baker (politician) (1938–1997), British Member of Parliament and government minister
Nick Baker (naturalist) (born 1972), English naturalist and television presenter
Nicholas Baker (rower) (born 1985), Australian lightweight rower
Nicholas John Baker, British citizen who was convicted of smuggling cocaine and ecstasy into Japan
Niels Bohr (1885–1962), who assumed the name "Nicholas Baker" while working on the Manhattan Project

See also

Nicholson Baker (born 1957), American novelist
Nicholas Barker (born 1973), British drummer
Nicholas Robinson-Baker (born 1987), English diver